Eulji University is a private healthcare and medical research university in South Korea with campuses in Seongnam City, Gyeonggi Province, and in central Daejeon. The school was established by Dr. Park Jun-yeong and the Eulji Educational Foundation, which grew out of the Eulji Hospital that opened in 1981.

Organization
Eulji University has a College of Nursing, a Department of Medicine that includes undergraduate pre-medical and graduate medical schools, a College of Health Sciences that includes dentistry, emergency medicine, radiological science, biomedical engineering, physical therapy, and cosmetic medicine, a College of Health Industry that includes nutrition, environmental and safety fields, medical information technology, marketing and management, early childhood education, mortuary science and addiction and social services fields, and a Department of Liberal Arts. The Graduate School includes most of the major undergraduate medical fields, as well as clinical psychology, senior healthcare and ophthalmology.

The original Eulji Hospital in Seoul remains in operation, along with a teaching hospital in Daejeon.

See also
Education in South Korea
List of medical schools in South Korea
List of universities and colleges in South Korea

External links 
 
 School website, in English

Universities and colleges in Daejeon
Medical schools in South Korea
Hospitals established in 1981
Jung District, Daejeon
Seongnam